The 1961 Amateur World Series was the 15th Amateur World Series. It was the only one held in Costa Rica, taking place in San Jose. It was held from April 7 through April 21, 1961. It was the first international tournament to feature a Cuban entry since the Cuban revolution.

Final standings

References

Baseball World Cup, 1961
Baseball World Cup
1961 in Costa Rica